The 2022–23 Elite Youth League, also known as 2022–23 Hero U-17 Youth Cup (for sponsorship ties with Hero MotoCorp), was the thirteenth season of the Indian Elite Youth League and the first season of the competition as an under-17 category.

The 2019–20 season was abandoned midway and the league was not held since then due to the coronavirus pandemic.

Changes in format
The new season saw reduction in number of games with a short format spanning over a month.
 The tournament would take place across ten venues, with single round-robin format in the group and knockout stage.
 The 49 teams from 29 states and union territories were divided in ten groups. Ten group winners and six best group runners-up qualified for the knockout stage.
 Round of 16 has been introduced for the first time ever.

Teams
A total of 49 teams from 29 states and union territories participate in the tournament. States and union territories without any teams include: Andaman and Nicobar Islands, Andhra Pradesh, Arunachal Pradesh, Haryana, Mizoram, Nagaland and Tripura.

Group stage

Group A
All matches will be held in Bengaluru.

Group B
All matches will be held in Kolkata.

Group C
All matches will be held in Patna.

Group D
All matches will be held in Imphal.

Group E
All matches will be held in Hyderabad.

Group F
All matches will be held in Phagwara.

Group G
All matches will be held in Bokaro.

Group H
All matches will be held in Rudrapur.

Group I
All matches will be held in Bhilai.

Group J
All matches will be held in Goa.

Ranking of second-placed teams
Due to Group H having lesser number of teams, the results against the fifth-placed teams in five-team groups are not considered for this ranking.

Knockout stage

Bracket

Round of 16

Quarter-finals

Semi-finals

Final

Statistics

Top scorers

Clean sheets

Hat-tricks

See also
2022–23 Indian Super League
2022–23 I-League
2022–23 I-League 2
2022–23 Indian State Leagues

References

External links 
 Elite League on the I-League website
 Elite League on the AIFF website

Youth League U18
2022–23 in Indian football